A Step is a 1988 Soviet drama film directed by Aleksandr Mitta.

Plot 
1959 year. Japanese Keiko, together with the Soviet counterpart Gusev, are managed to send the polio vaccine to Japan, as a result of which the lives of 10 million Japanese children were saved.

Cast 
 Leonid Filatov
 Komaki Kurihara
 Oleg Tabakov as Tutunov
 Elena Yakovleva
 Goh Watanabe
 Vladimir Ilin
 Andrey Kharitonov		
 Akira Kume
 Taketoshi Naitô	
 Detlev Kügow

References

External links 
 

1988 films
1980s Russian-language films
1980s Japanese-language films
Soviet drama films
Japanese drama films
Japanese multilingual films
Soviet multilingual films
1988 multilingual films
1988 drama films
Films directed by Alexander Mitta
1980s Japanese films